The 2019 Northwest Territories Men's Curling Championship was played February 7–10 at the Yellowknife Curling Club in Yellowknife. The winning Jamie Koe team represented the Northwest Territories at the 2019 Tim Hortons Brier in Brandon, Manitoba, Canada's national men's curling championship.

Teams

The teams are listed as follows:

Round robin standings

Scores

February 7
Draw 1
Dunbar 6-3 Hudy
Mcleod 10-4 McArthur
Koe 8-6 Skauge

February 8
Draw 2
Hudy 8-4 Skauge
Koe 11-2 McArthur 
Mcleod 7-4 Dunbar

Draw 3
Koe 11-2 Mcleod
Skauge 6-4 Dunbar
Hudy 9-5 McArthur

February 9
Draw 4
Dunbar 4-3 McArthur
Koe 8-1 Hudy
Skauge 12-5 Mcleod

Draw 5
Skauge 11-2 McArthur
Hudy 7-4 Mcleod
Koe 12-3 Dunbar

Playoffs

Semifinal
February 10, 9:00am

Final
February 10, 2:00pm

References

2019 Tim Hortons Brier
Curling in the Northwest Territories
2019 in the Northwest Territories
Northwest Territories Men's Curling Championship
Sport in Yellowknife